The 2016 Mountain West Conference women's soccer tournament was the postseason women's soccer tournament for the Mountain West Conference held from November 1 to 5, 2016. The five match tournament was held at the SDSU Sports Deck in San Diego, California. The six team single-elimination tournament consisted of three rounds based on seeding from regular season conference play. The San Jose State Spartans were the defending tournament champions after defeating the San Diego State Aztecs in a penalty kick shootout in the championship match.

Bracket

Schedule

First round

Semifinals

Final

References

External links 

Mountain West Conference Women's Soccer Tournament
2016 Mountain West Conference women's soccer season